Edmund Law (6 June 1703 – 14 August 1787) was a priest in the Church of England. He served as Master of Peterhouse, Cambridge, as Knightbridge Professor of Philosophy in the University of Cambridge from 1764 to 1769, and as bishop of Carlisle from 1768 to 1787.

Life
Law was born in the parish of Cartmel, Grange-over-Sands, Lancashire on 6 June 1703. The bishop's father, Edmund Law, descended from a family of yeomen or statesmen, long settled at Askham in Westmoreland, was the son of Edmund Law, of Carhullan and Measand (will dated 1689), by his wife Elizabeth Wright of Measand. The bishop's father was curate of Staveley-in-Cartmel, and master of a small school there from 1693 to 1742. He married at Kendal 29 November 1701 Patience Langbaine, of the parish of Kirkby-Kendal, who was buried in Cartmel Churchyard. He seems on his marriage to have settled on his wife's property at Buck Crag, about four miles from Staveley. There his only son, Edmund - the future bishop, was born. The boy, educated first at Cartmel school, and afterwards at the free grammar school at Kendal, went to St. John's College, Cambridge. He earned his B.A. in 1723. Soon elected fellow of Christ's College, he proceeded M.A. in 1727. He was always an earnest student. At Cambridge his chief friends were Daniel Waterland, master of Magdalene College, John Jortin, and John Taylor, the editor of Demosthenes. He was said  to be a great personal influence on the intellectual development of Richard Watson, Bishop of Landaff.

In 1737, Law was presented with the living of Greystoke in Cumberland, the gift of which at this time devolved on the university, and soon afterwards he married Mary Christian of Royal lineage, the daughter of John Christian of Milntown, Isle of Man and Unerring in Cumberland. In 1743, he was made archdeacon of Carlisle, and in 1746 he left Greystoke for Great Salkeld, the rectory of which was annexed to the archdeaconry.

Law became Master of Peterhouse on 12 November 1754, and at the same time resigned his archdeaconry. In 1760, Law was appointed librarian, or rather proto-bibliothecarius, of the university of Cambridge, an office created in 1721, and first filled by Dr. Conyers Middleton, and in 1764 he was made Knightbridge professor of moral philosophy. In 1763, he was presented to the archdeaconry of Staffordshire and a prebend in Lichfield Cathedral by his former pupil, Frederick Cornwallis; he received a prebend in Lincoln Cathedral in 1764, and in 1767, a prebendal stall in Durham Cathedral through the influence of the Duke of Newcastle.

Bishop of Carlisle 

In 1768, Law was recommended by the Duke of Grafton, then chancellor of the university, to the bishopric of Carlisle. His friend and biographer, William Paley, declares that Law regarded his elevation as a satisfactory proof that decent freedom of inquiry was not discouraged.

Death and legacy 

Law died at Rose Castle, in Dalston, Cumbria on 14 August 1787, in his eighty-fifth year. He was buried in Carlisle Cathedral, where the inscription on his monument commemorates his zeal alike for Christian truth and Christian liberty, adding "religionem simplicem et incorruptam nisi salva libertate stare non-posse arbitratus." His biographer, who knew him well, describes the bishop as "a man of great softnesse of manners, and of the mildest and most tranquil disposition. His voice was never raised above its ordinary pitch. His countenance seemed never to have been ruffled."

Law's wife predeceased him in 1772, leaving eight sons and four daughters:
 Edmund Law (1741–1758)
 Bridget Law (1742, died aged 6 days)
 Mary Law (1744–1768), married James Stephen Lushington 
 John Law (1745–1810), Bishop of Elphin
 Elizabeth Law (1746–1767)
 Ewan Law (1747–1829), MP for Westbury (1795–1800) and Newtown (1802)
 Edward Law, 1st Baron Ellenborough (1750–1818), Lord Chief Justice
 Christian Law (1752–1773)
 Joanna Law (1753–1823), married Sir Thomas Rumbold, Governor of Madras
 Joseph Law (1755–1818)
 Thomas Law (1756–1834), investor in Washington, D.C.
 George Henry Law (1761–1845), Bishop of Chester and Bishop of Bath and Wells.

The bishop's portrait was three times painted by Romney: in 1777 for Sir Thomas Rumbolt; in 1783 for Dr. John Law, then Bishop of Clonfert; and a half-length, without his robes, in 1787 for Edward Law, afterwards Lord Ellenborough.

Works 

His first literary work was his Essay on the Origin of Evil, a translation of Archbishop William King's De Origine Mali, which Law illustrated with copious notes in 1731. In 1734, while still at Christ's College, he prepared, with John Taylor, Thomas Johnson, and Sandys Hutchinson, an edition of Robert Estienne's Thesaurus Linguæ Latinæ, and in the same year appeared his Enquiry into the Ideas of Space and Time, an attack upon à priori proofs of the existence of God, in answer to a work by John Jackson entitled The Existence and Unity of God proved from his Nature and Attributes.

The work by which he is perhaps best known, Considerations on the State of the World with regard to the Theory of Religion, was published by him at Cambridge in 1745. The main idea of the book is that the human race has been, and is, through a process of divine education, gradually and continuously progressing in religion, natural or revealed, at the same rate as it progresses in all other knowledge. In his philosophical opinions he was an ardent disciple of John Locke, in politics he was a whig, and as a priest he represented the most latitudinarian position of the day, but his Christian belief was grounded firmly on the evidence of miracles The Theory of Religion went through many editions, being subsequently enlarged with Reflections on the Life and Character of Christ, and an Appendix concerning the use of the words Soul and Spirit in the Holy Scripture. Another edition, with Paley's life of the author prefixed, was published by his son, George Henry Law, then bishop of Chester, in 1820. A German translation, made from the fifth enlarged edition, was printed at Leipzig in 1771.

In 1754, Law advocated in his public exercise for the degree of D.D. his favourite doctrine that the soul, which in his view was not naturally immortal, passed into a state of sleep between death and the resurrection. This theory met with much opposition; it was, however, defended by Archdeacon Francis Blackburne.

In 1774, Law, now a bishop, published anonymously an outspoken declaration in favour of religious toleration in a pamphlet entitled Considerations on the Propriety of requiring Subscription to Articles of Faith. It was suggested by a petition presented to parliament in 1772, by Archdeacon Francis Blackburne and others for the abolition of subscription, and Law argued that it was unreasonable to impose upon a clergyman in any church more than a promise to comply with its liturgy, rites, and offices, without exacting any profession of such minister's present belief, still less any promise of constant belief, in particular doctrines. The publication was attacked by Thomas Randolph of Oxford, and defended by A Friend of Religious Liberty in a tract attributed by some to Paley, and said to have been his first literary production.

In 1777 Law published an edition of the Works of Locke, in 4 vols., with a preface and a life of the author. This included, anonymously, his 1769 essay 'A Defence of Mr. Locke's Opinion Concerning Personal Identity'. Law also published several sermons. His interleaved Bible, with many manuscript notes, is preserved in the British Museum.

See also 

List of bishops of Carlisle

Notes

Further reading
 An essay on the several dispensations of God to mankind in the order in which they lie in the Bible : or, A short system of the religion of nature and scripture ; with a preface shewing the causes of the growth of infidelity (1728)
 An enquiry into the ideas of space, time, immensity, and eternity ; as also the self-existence, necessary existence, and unity of the divine nature : in answer to a book lately publish'd by Mr. Jackson, entitled, 'The existence and unity of God proved from His nature and attributes' (1734) 
An essay on the origin of evil (1739)
 Litigiousness Repugnant to the Laws of Christianity (1743)
 Considerations on the state of the world with regard to the theory of religion : in three parts ... Being the substance of some sermons preach'd before the University of Cambridge (1745)
 Considerations on the State of the World with Regard to the Theory of Religion: In Three Parts (1745)
 Reflections on the Life and Character of Christ: With an Essay on the Nature and End of Death Under the Christian Covenant; . With a summary and appendix on the Gospel Morals (1745)
 A Defence of Mr. Locke's Opinion Concerning Personal Identity (1769). Reprinted as Appendix II to Galen Strawson Locke on Personal Identity (Princeton: Princeton University Press, 2014).
 Betrachtungen über die Geschichte der Religion, nebst zwo Abhandlungen von dem Leben und Charakter Christi, und von der Natur und dem Endzwecke des Todes unter dem christlichen Bunde (1771 translation of Considerations to German)

References
 W. Paley, A short memoir of the life of Edmund Law (1800)

Attribution

1703 births
1787 deaths
Bishops of Carlisle
Archdeacons of Stafford
Archdeacons of Carlisle
People from Grange-over-Sands
Alumni of St John's College, Cambridge
Fellows of Christ's College, Cambridge
Fellows of Peterhouse, Cambridge
Masters of Peterhouse, Cambridge
Cambridge University Librarians
Vice-Chancellors of the University of Cambridge
18th-century Church of England bishops
People from Cartmel
Knightbridge Professors of Philosophy